Camaldolese Bible is the first known complete translation of Bible into Slovak language. The Bible was translated from Vulgate by Camaldolese monks at Červený Kláštor monastery. The completed translation had been rewritten in 1756–1759. The translation is characterized by the effort to use forms and expressions of common Slovak spoken language, with distinctive Western-Slovak elements and some literary linguistic elements of Czech origin.

References

External links
 The Camaldolese Bible - The Old Testament 
 The Camaldolese Bible - The New Testament

Language
Slovak
Slovak language
Slovak literature